The Nardini was a French automobile manufactured only in 1914.  A light car, it was built by a M. Nardini and designed to be sold on the English market.  The cars were powered by Altos engines of 1244 cc and 1779 cc.

References
David Burgess Wise, The New Illustrated Encyclopedia of Automobiles.

Defunct motor vehicle manufacturers of France